Federico Piovaccari (born 1 September 1984) is an Italian professional footballer who plays as a forward for  club Giugliano.

Club career

Early career
Born in Gallarate, Piovaccari graduated from Pro Patria's youth setup, and made his debuts while on loan at Serie D side Castellettese. In the summer of 2003, he joined Internazionale, being assigned to the Primavera squad.

In 2004, Piovaccari was loaned to Vittoria, and scored ten goals for the club in Serie C1. In July 2005, he was loaned to Treviso of Serie B, but after the latter's promotion to Serie A due to Caso Genoa, he moved to San Marino Calcio in the third level, also in a temporary deal.

Treviso; Ravenna
After a loan spell at second-tier Triestina, Piovaccari returned to Treviso, now in a co-ownership deal. In July 2009, the free agent signed a two-year deal with Lega Pro Prima Divisione side Ravenna after Treviso's bankruptcy, as a replacement to Pescara-bound Francesco Zizzari.

Piovaccari scored in his debut for the club on 3 August 2009, netting the winner of a 3–2 win against Giulianova, in that season's Coppa Italia. He was the team top-scorer in the campaign, scoring 14 goals and appearing in 30 matches in the league, as the Giallorossi narrowly avoided relegation.

Cittadella
Piovaccari moved to Cittadella, also in the second level, on 31 August 2010 in a co-ownership deal for €120,000, while Paolo Rossi moved in the opposite direction. The club sold its flagship striker for the second successive year (Riccardo Meggiorini in 2010 and Matteo Ardemagni in 2011). Piovaccari  was also top goalscorer in the 2010–11 campaign, scoring 23 league goals.

On 24 June 2011, Cittadella bought Piovaccari's remaining registration rights for €880,000.

Sampdoria
On 8 July 2011, Piovaccari moved to another Serie B side, Sampdoria, for €3.5 million in a four-year contract. After appearing sparingly, he moved to Brescia on 31 January 2012, on loan until June (along with Salvatore Foti) and with Juan Antonio and Andrea Magrassi moving in the opposite direction. During the 2012 financial year, Piovaccari also signed a new contract which last until 30 June 2016.

After returning to Sampdoria, Piovaccari was loaned out again to Novara, and subsequently served another temporary deal at Grosseto, featuring regularly with the latter.

Steaua București (loan)
In July 2013, Piovaccari was loaned to Romanian club Steaua București in a season-long deal. He made his debut in the Romanian Supercup in a 3–0 win over Petrolul Ploiești, coming on as a substitute for Stefan Nikolić.

On 24 July, Piovaccari scored his first goal for Steaua, in a 2–1 second leg win against Vardar Skopje in the campaign's UEFA Champions League qualifiers. He scored 16 goals during the campaign, winning the Liga I and the Supercupa României.

Eibar (loan)
On 19 August 2014, Piovaccari was loaned to Spanish side Eibar, newly promoted to La Liga. He made his debut for the club on 24 August, replacing Ander Capa in the dying minutes of a 1–0 home win against Real Sociedad. On 1 July 2015, Piovaccari was released by Sampdoria.

Later years
On 27 July 2015, Piovaccari was unveiled as the marquee of Australian club Western Sydney Wanderers' 2015–16 A-League campaign. He was released by the club on 5 May 2016.

On 17 August 2016, Piovaccari signed a one-year contract with Spanish Segunda División side Córdoba. On 5 July 2017, it was reported that Piovaccari joined Chinese club Zhejiang Yiteng.

On 10 January 2018, Serie B club Ternana announced the signing of Piovaccari on a 6-month contract, with option to extent to further season. On 16 August 2018, Piovaccari returned to Córdoba after agreeing to a one-year contract.

On 15 July 2019, Piovaccari signed a one-year contract with fellow second division side Rayo Vallecano.

On 26 August 2021, he returned to Italy and signed with Paganese in Serie C. On 31 January 2022, his contract was terminated by mutual consent. On the next day, Piovaccari signed with ACR Messina.

International career
In 2005, Piovaccari played for Italy U23 on 2005 Mediterranean Games.

Career statistics

Honours
Steaua București
 Romanian Liga I: 2013–14
 Romanian Supercup: 2013

Individual
 Serie B top scorer: 2010–11 (23 goals)

References

External links
 
 Profile at gazzetta.it  
 Football.it profile  
 
 

1984 births
Living people
People from Gallarate
Footballers from Lombardy
Italian footballers
Association football forwards
Serie B players
Serie C players
Aurora Pro Patria 1919 players
Inter Milan players
F.C. Vittoria players
A.S.D. Victor San Marino players
U.S. Triestina Calcio 1918 players
Treviso F.B.C. 1993 players
Ravenna F.C. players
A.S. Cittadella players
U.C. Sampdoria players
Brescia Calcio players
Novara F.C. players
F.C. Grosseto S.S.D. players
Ternana Calcio players
Paganese Calcio 1926 players
A.C.R. Messina players
S.S.C. Giugliano players
Liga I players
FC Steaua București players
La Liga players
Segunda División players
Segunda División B players
SD Eibar footballers
Rayo Vallecano players
Córdoba CF players
A-League Men players
Marquee players (A-League Men)
Western Sydney Wanderers FC players
China League One players
Zhejiang Yiteng F.C. players
Italian expatriate footballers
Italian expatriate sportspeople in San Marino
Expatriate footballers in San Marino
Italian expatriate sportspeople in Romania
Expatriate footballers in Romania
Italian expatriate sportspeople in Spain
Expatriate footballers in Spain
Italian expatriate sportspeople in Australia
Expatriate soccer players in Australia
Expatriate footballers in China
Italy youth international footballers
Sportspeople from the Province of Varese